Extravagenza is a live album by New Zealand rock band Split Enz. Comprising recordings from the Palmerston North, New Plymouth and Auckland shows of the band's 1993 20th Anniversary Tour of New Zealand, the album is an expanded, remixed and remastered version of their 1994 live album Anniversary. The canned audience loop used on Anniversary was removed, giving the recordings a more natural feel.

Track listing

CD 1
 "Shark Attack" (Tim Finn) – 3:13
 "Poor Boy" (Tim Finn) – 3:45
 "Message to My Girl" (Neil Finn) – 4:53
 "Dirty Creature" (Tim Finn, Nigel Griggs, Neil Finn) – 5:41
 "Strait Old Line"/"The Woman Who Loves You" (Neil Finn -- Phil Judd, Tim Finn) – 7:54
 "Haul Away"/"Brandy"/"I Saw Her Standing There"/"Irish Heartbeat" (Tim Finn—Scott English, Richard Kerr -- John Lennon, Paul McCartney -- Van Morrison) – 5:01
 "I Got You" (Neil Finn) – 4:20
 "Going Down to the Woolshed"/"Best Friend" (Tim Finn -- Tim Finn, Neil Finn) – 3:16
 "One Step Ahead" (Neil Finn) – 3:05
 "Split Ends" (Phil Judd, Tim Finn) – 2:15
 "Time for a Change" (Phil Judd) – 3:31

CD 2
 "True Colours (Let's Rock)" (Phil Judd) – 0:43
 "I See Red" (Tim Finn) – 4:19
 "Bold as Brass" (Tim Finn, Robert Gillies) – 4:35
 "Give It a Whirl" (Tim Finn, Neil Finn) – 3:00
 "Pioneer" (Eddie Rayner) – 1:54
 "Six Months in a Leaky Boat" (Tim Finn, Split Enz) – 5:15
 "Years Go By" (Neil Finn, Eddie Rayner) – 4:18
 "Without a Doubt" (Tim Finn) – 5:36
 "Hermit McDermitt" (Tim Finn) – 5:33
 "What's the Matter with You" (Neil Finn) – 3:30
 "Charlie" (Tim Finn) – 5:47
 "History Never Repeats" (Neil Finn) – 3:41

Personnel
Tim Finn – vocals & keyboards
Neil Finn – vocals & guitar
Noel Crombie – percussion
Eddie Rayner – keyboards
Paul Hester – drums
Nigel Griggs – bass

Production
Recorded live during the 20th Anniversary Tour of New Zealand, March 1993
Producer: Eddie Rayner
Recording Engineer: Angus Davidson
Mixing Engineer: Adrian Stuckey
Recording Assistant: Greg Peacock
Mixed & Mastered at Bignote Studios, Burleigh Heads, Queensland, Australia by Eddie Rayner & Adrian Stuckey

References

Liberation Blue albums
2005 live albums
Split Enz live albums